The Kontinental Hockey League All-Star Game is an exhibition ice hockey game that marks the midway point of the Kontinental Hockey League's regular season, with many of the league's star players playing against each other. The starting lineup for the two teams, including the starting goaltender, is voted on by fans, while the secondary lines and goaltenders are voted upon by the media. At 2019 it was the first time that Wisehockey realtime tracking system was used in KHL All-Star Game.

Editions

Legends game

References

External links
KHL All Stars Game
KHL All-Star Game Scoring Records

 
Ice hockey all-star games